Emilio José Sánchez Fuentes (born 30 April 1985 in Albacete, Castile-La Mancha) is a Spanish former professional footballer who played as a midfielder.

External links

1985 births
Living people
Sportspeople from Albacete
Spanish footballers
Footballers from Castilla–La Mancha
Association football midfielders
Segunda División players
Segunda División B players
Atlético Levante UD players
Levante UD footballers
CF Villanovense players
Real Jaén footballers
Deportivo Alavés players
Recreativo de Huelva players
Real Murcia players
CD Mirandés footballers
UE Costa Brava players
Cypriot First Division players
Doxa Katokopias FC players
Spanish expatriate footballers
Expatriate footballers in Cyprus
Spanish expatriate sportspeople in Cyprus